Louis Vernet (5 May 1870 – 19 March 1946) was a French archer.  He won a silver medal at the 1908 Summer Olympics in London. Vernet entered the men's double York round event in 1908, taking 20th place with 385 points. His next competition, the Continental style, resulted in Vernet taking second place.  His score of 256 points was only 7 below that of the winner, Eugène Grisot.

References

Sources

External links
 Louis Vernet's profile on databaseOlympics.com
 Louis Vernet's profile at Sports Reference.com

1870 births
1946 deaths
Archers at the 1908 Summer Olympics
Olympic archers of France
French male archers
Olympic silver medalists for France
Olympic medalists in archery
Medalists at the 1908 Summer Olympics